Mishaum Point is the southernmost point of Bristol County in southeastern Massachusetts.Mishaum Point is a private gated. It extends into Buzzards Bay.

Notes

External links

References
Merriam-Webster's Geographical Dictionary, Third Edition. Springfield, Massachusetts: Merriam-Webster, Incorporated, 1997. .

Landforms of Bristol County, Massachusetts
Headlands of Massachusetts